Great Barn is an historic building in the English civil parish of Ightenhill, Lancashire.

See also
Grade I listed buildings in Lancashire
Listed buildings in Ightenhill

References

Grade I listed barns
Grade I listed buildings in Lancashire
Buildings and structures in Burnley
1605 establishments in England